Marie-Yasmine Alidou d'Anjou (born April 28, 1995) is a Canadian soccer player who plays as a midfielder for Portuguese club Famalicão and the Canada women's national team.

Early life
Alidou was born in Montreal, Quebec and raised in Saint-Hubert, Quebec to a Beninese father and a French Canadian mother. She played the majority of her youth soccer with CS St-Hubert and also had stints with FC St-Leonard, Lanaudiere Sud and Varennes-St. Amable.

College career
Alidou has attended the Université du Québec à Montréal. In 2016, she was named RSEQ Player of the Week for Week 2, UQAM Athlete of the Year, an RSEQ First Team All-Star, and a U Sports Second Team All-Star.

Club career
In 2017, Alidou joined French club Olympique de Marseille.

After Marseille was relegated in 2018, she moved to Swedish club Linköpings FC. 

In 2019, she joined Sporting de Huelva in Spain.

Afterwards she played for Klepp IL in Norway.

In 2022, she joined Sturm Graz.

International career
She represented Canada at the 2017 FISU Universiade Games.

Alidou made her senior debut for Canada on February 23, 2022 against Spain at the 2022 Arnold Clark Cup.

References

External links

1995 births
Living people
Soccer players from Montreal
Sportspeople from Longueuil
Soccer people from Quebec
Canadian women's soccer players
Women's association football midfielders
Université du Québec à Montréal alumni
Olympique de Marseille (women) players
Linköpings FC players
Sporting de Huelva players
Klepp IL players
SK Sturm Graz (women) players
Division 1 Féminine players
Damallsvenskan players
Primera División (women) players
Toppserien players
Canada women's international soccer players
Canadian expatriate women's soccer players
Canadian expatriate sportspeople in France
Expatriate women's footballers in France
Canadian expatriate sportspeople in Sweden
Expatriate women's footballers in Sweden
Canadian expatriate sportspeople in Spain
Expatriate women's footballers in Spain
Canadian expatriate sportspeople in Norway
Expatriate women's footballers in Norway
Canadian expatriate sportspeople in Austria
Expatriate women's footballers in Austria
Black Canadian women's soccer players
Canadian people of Beninese descent
Canadian sportspeople of African descent
Sportspeople of Beninese descent
French Quebecers
Francophone Quebec people